Future Development is the third solo studio album by American hip hop musician Del the Funky Homosapien. It was released by Hieroglyphics Imperium Recordings in 1997. It was able to achieve decent success, selling over 400,000 copies worldwide.

Critical reception
Stanton Swihart of AllMusic gave the album 3 stars out of 5, saying, "the album is less coherent than his previous two albums and less immediate-sounding without being immaterial." In a 2000 article, Charles Aaron of Spin called it "perhaps Del's finest [album]".

Track listing

References

Further reading

External links
 

1997 albums
Del the Funky Homosapien albums
Hieroglyphics Imperium Recordings albums